Mubarak Ibn Ahmad Sharaf al-Din Ibn al-Mustawfi al-Lakhmi al-Irbili (b. 1169 – d. 1239), a famous Muslim historian of Erbil, who was born in the ancient citadel of Erbil. He wrote in several areas, history, literature and language. His masterpiece is a four volumes book of (History of Erbil).

Biography
He was born in the Castle of Erbil and grew up in the house of the leadership and science, his father and uncle were his teachers when he  began his education, and his father encouraged him to go to the scholars of Erbil to continue his education. He studied rhetoric, and learned everything related to it, he was also interested in science of language and literature.

He was a poet and minister in Erbil, he was the vizier of Muzaffar ad-Din Gökböri, governor of Erbil in the reign of Sultan Saladin, and subsequently independent ruler of Erbil.

In the year 1236, after the death of Gökböri, Ibn al-Mustawfi moved to Mosul following the Mongol sacking of Erbil, and lived there until his death in 1239.

List of works
 Tārīkh Irbil: al-musammā Nabāhat al-balad al-Khāmil bi-man waradahu min al-amāthil, four volumes.
 Kitab al-Nizam fi shi'ar al-Mutanabbi wa abi Tammam, ten volumes.
 Kitab ithbat al-muhasaal fi nisbet abyat al-mufasaal, two volumes.
 Kitab sr al-Sanaah 
 Kitab aba qimash, a collection a lot of literature and anecdotes.
 Kitab Ahkam al-Nijoom
 He also wrote a collection of poems.

References

1169 births
1239 deaths
12th-century Arabic poets
Hadith scholars
13th-century Arabic poets